Compostibacter is a genus of bacteria from the family of Chitinophagaceae with one known species (Compostibacter hankyongensis). Compostibacter hankyongensis has been isolated from compost.

References

Chitinophagia
Bacteria genera
Monotypic bacteria genera
Taxa described in 2016